Fernando Vérgez Alzaga L.C. (born 1 March 1945) is a Spanish prelate of the Catholic Church who has been President of the Pontifical Commission for Vatican City State and President of the Governorate of Vatican City State since 1 October 2021. He was Secretary General of the Governorate of Vatican City State from 2013 to 2021 and before that director of the Vatican City State Telecommunications Directorate.

He has worked in the Roman Curia since 1972. He was made a bishop in 2013 and given the personal title of archbishop in 2021.

Pope Francis made him a cardinal 27 August 2022. He is the first member of the Legion of Christ to become a cardinal.

Life
Vérgez was born in Salamanca on 1 March 1945. On 25 December 1965 he made a profession of faith with the clerical congregation of the Legion of Christ, and on 26 November 1969 was ordained as a priest by Cardinal Ildebrando Antoniutti. Vérgez studied at the Pontifical Gregorian University in Rome, earning degrees in philosophy and theology, and then a diploma as an archivist from the Vatican Secret Archives.

In 1972 he entered the service of the Roman Curia as an assistant in the Congregation for Institutes of Consecrated Life and Societies of Apostolic Life. In April 1984 he moved to the Pontifical Council for the Laity. He was appointed head of the ordinary section of the Administration of the Patrimony of the Apostolic See and in June 2004 became head of the Internet Office of the Holy See. On 1 February 2008, Pope Benedict XVI appointed Vérgez as Telecommunications Director of the Vatican City, with the Poste Vaticane. On 30 August 2013, Pope Francis promoted him to be Secretary General of the Governorate of Vatican City State, succeeding Bishop Giuseppe Sciacca.

On 15 October 2013 Pope Francis named Vérgez titular bishop of Villamagna in Proconsulari, and on 15 November, in St Peter's Basilica, he was consecrated as a bishop by the pope, assisted by Cardinal Giuseppe Bertello and Bishop Brian Farrell.

On 5 October 2020, Pope Francis appointed him to the five-member commission for reserved matters, a financial oversight board responsible for monitoring contracts that fall outside normal procedures and which for security reasons are not made public.

On 8 September 2021, Pope Francis appointed him to succeed Cardinal Giuseppe Bertello as President of the Pontifical Commission for Vatican City State and President of the Governorate of Vatican City State, effective 1 October 2021. He was also given the personal title of archbishop.

On 27 August 2022, Pope Francis made him a cardinal deacon, assigning him the deaconry Santa Maria della Mercede e Sant'Adriano a Villa Albani.

See also
 Cardinals created by Pope Francis

References

External links

 

1945 births
Living people
21st-century Italian titular bishops
Pontifical Gregorian University alumni
Legionaries of Christ
People from Salamanca
Officials of the Roman Curia
21st-century Spanish cardinals
Cardinals created by Pope Francis